The Honor of His House is a 1918 American silent drama film directed by William C. deMille and written by Marion Fairfax. The film stars Sessue Hayakawa, Florence Vidor, Jack Holt, Mayme Kelso, Kisaburo Kurihara, and Forrest Seabury. The film was released on 1 April 1918, by Paramount Pictures.

Plot

The Toronto Daily Star said of the film that it was "a photo-drama of rare strength featuring Sessue Hayakawa, the well-known Japanese actor. This photo-play has an absorbing theme that rises in the denouement to a tragic height, the supreme sacrifice of one man securing the happiness of the woman he loves and insuring her a peaceful future with her child. Sessue Hayakawa plays the principal role with that reserve of intense strength that marks all his characterizations. He is surrounded by a magnificent cast headed by Florence Vidor."

Cast 
Sessue Hayakawa as Count Ito Onato
Florence Vidor as Lora Horning
Jack Holt as Robert Farlow
Mayme Kelso as Mrs. Proudweather
Kisaburo Kurihara as Sato 
Forrest Seabury as Mr. Proudweather

References

External links 
 

1918 films
1910s English-language films
Silent American drama films
1918 drama films
Paramount Pictures films
Films directed by William C. deMille
American black-and-white films
American silent feature films
1910s American films